The  Röslau or Rösla is a right-hand tributary of the river Ohře in northeast Bavaria in Germany.

It is formed from several small tributaries that come together on the eastern slope of the Schneeberg west of the Vordorf Mill (Vordorfermühle) at Trostau in the Russel forest division.

Spring tapping 
The source is the start point of the 44 km long Röslau Path, which was created in 1980 by Fichtelgebirge Club. The Seenweg path from Weißenstädter See to the Fichtelsee runs past the spring.

Course 
After leaving the steep slopes and high forest on the Schneeberg the Röslau runs past the Vordorf Mill, turns initially southeast to Leupoldsdorf and Tröstau, grazes Wunsiedel and swings gradually in an easterly and northeasterly direction. Along the way it picks up numerous brooks from the region of the Platte, Hohe Matze and Kösseine. Near Thölau the great railway bridge on the Marktredwitz to Hof line stretches across the Röslau valley. Next it reaches Lorenzreuth and Seußen, where it is reinforced by the Kössein. It flows through the narrow valley of the Gsteinigt to Arzberg and snakes through pastureland to the  Schirnding. East of the village it forms Germany's boundary with the Czech Republic until it discharges into the Eger near Fischern.

Economic usage 
Since the Middle Ages the river was used to drive the many hammer mills and corn mills along its length. The town of Wunsiedel also used the watercourse from the 16th century for timber rafting.

Origin of the name 
The river was first mentioned quite late on, in 1403, under the name of Rosslin and then under various spellings. Colloquially it is called the Riasla and, on official maps, the Röslau. Recent research suggests the name combines words meaning "in lively motion, stirring" and "flowing" or "streaming".

Further reading 
Dietmar Herrmann: Lexikon Fichtelgebirge. Ackermann Verlag Hof/Saale

References

External links 
www.bayern-fichtelgebirge.de 

Rivers of Bavaria
Rivers of Germany
Czech Republic–Germany border
Rivers of the Czech Republic
International rivers of Europe
Border rivers